Trochus ferreirai is a species of sea snail, a marine gastropod mollusk in the family Trochidae, the top snails.

Description
The size of the shell varies between 20 mm and 26 mm.

Distribution
This marine species occurs off the Philippines.

References

 Bozzetti, L. (1996). Lopha poppei n. sp. and Trochus ferreirai n. sp. Two new species from Pacific Ocean. World Shells. 16: 65–67.

External links
 Adams, A. (1855). Further contribution towards the natural history of the Trochidae: with the description of a new genus and several new species, from the Cumingian collection. Proceedings of the Zoological Society of London. (1854) 22: 37-41, pl. 27
 To World Register of Marine Species
 

ferreirai
Gastropods described in 1996